The 1982 NCAA Women's Soccer Tournament was the first annual single-elimination tournament, played during November 1982, to determine the national champion of NCAA women's collegiate soccer. The championship game was played at the University of Central Florida in Orlando, Florida on November 21, 1982. 

North Carolina defeated Central Florida in the final, 2–0, to win their first national title. This was the first of North Carolina head coach Anson Dorrance's 21 national championships with the Tar Heels (as of 2019).

The most outstanding offensive player was  Mary Varas (Central Florida), and the most outstanding defensive player was Linda Gancitano (Central Florida). There was no All-Tournament team named this year. Three players, with 2 goals each, were the leading scorers of the tournament. The most valuable player was goalkeeper  Kim Wyant (Central Florida).

Qualification
At the time, there was only one NCAA championship for women's soccer; a Division III title was added in 1986 and a Division II title in 1988. Hence, all NCAA women's soccer programs  (whether from Division I, Division II, or Division III) were eligible for this championship. A total of 12 teams were ultimately invited to contest this tournament.

Bracket

Tournament scoring leaders

See also 
 NCAA Division I women's soccer championship
 1982 NCAA Division I Men's Soccer Championship

References

NCAA
NCAA Women's Soccer Championship
 
NCAA Women's Soccer Tournament